Izboskan is an urban-type settlement in Andijan Region, Uzbekistan. It is part of Paxtaobod District. Its population is 6,800 (2016).

References

Populated places in Andijan Region
Urban-type settlements in Uzbekistan